Cmereška Gorca is a settlement in the Municipality of Podčetrtek in eastern Slovenia. The area around Podčetrtek was traditionally part of the region of Styria. It is now included in the Savinja Statistical Region.

The settlement is built around a small hill with a local church dedicated to Saint Urban. It belongs to the Parish of Sveta Ema. Its belfry dates to the 17th century, but the remainder of the church was rebuilt in 1850.

References

External links
Cmereška Gorca on Geopedia

Populated places in the Municipality of Podčetrtek